Parcheqli (also Romanized as Pārcheqlī; also known as Pārcheqlī-ye Bālā and Pālcheqlī-ye Bālā) is a village in Golidagh Rural District, Golidagh District, Maraveh Tappeh County, Golestan Province, Iran. At the 2006 census, its population was 414, in 96 families.

References 

Populated places in Maraveh Tappeh County